The Badminton Club is a former London gentlemen's club. According to the 8th Duke of Beaufort in his book Driving (1889), the club was founded in 1875 at 100 Piccadilly by a sporting doctor called Hurman.  According to the Duke, "this was a thorough coaching establishment, having all the year round a coach, a brake, a team or two... capital stabling and coach-houses, as well as chambers and bedrooms kept for the use of members".

The club was named after Badminton House, the country seat of the Dukes of Beaufort.  The 10th Duke was Master of the Horse (1936–1978) to three British monarchs, King Edward VIII, King George VI, and Queen Elizabeth II. Since 1949, Badminton House has hosted the prestigious annual Badminton Horse Trials, a three-day competition event.

In 1883, the club also acquired the adjacent premises at 98 and 99 Piccadilly and a new clubhouse was built on the site, designed by the architect Robert William Edis.  The principal internal feature was the "Flower Court", approached through the narrow entrance from Piccadilly.

The club flourished so long as the horse remained supreme in London but, by the late 1930s, driving was only the pastime of a few.  The club had lost its raison d’etre and decided to disband in 1938.  At about that time the Public Schools Club was on the lookout for larger premises and they took over the clubhouse immediately.

The clubhouse was finally closed in 1972, when the Public Schools Club merged with the East India Club in St James's Square, and was demolished a few years later.  The last surviving parts of the clubhouse are the war memorial plaques for members of the Public Schools Club from World War I and World War II and the Badminton Club's plaque for World War I, which are still preserved at the East India Club.

References

See also
List of London's gentlemen's clubs

Gentlemen's clubs in London
Piccadilly
1875 in London
1875 establishments in England